The Armstrong Tower, also known as Alpine Tower, is a distinctive  (425 foot) tall lattice tower featuring three large cross-arms, located atop the Alpine, New Jersey palisades overlooking the Hudson River a few kilometers north of New York City at 40°57'39.0" N and 73°55'21.0" W (40.9607 -73.9225).

The tower is the permanent transmitter site for locally based experimental station WA2XMN and Fairleigh Dickinson University's educational FM station WFDU, in additional to numerous directional radio services (including as a cell site). It is clearly visible from across the Hudson River and is used as a Visual flight rules waypoint by aircraft flying within the New York City Special flight rules area.

The tower was originally constructed by inventor Edwin Howard Armstrong in 1938 for developmental activities that led to modern . At the tower base is a building originally used for research by Armstrong, which still has the W2XMN call sign engraved above its main entrance. This building currently houses the Armstrong Field Laboratory, and serves as a museum containing artifacts from the development of FM radio technology.

The structure was also used as a temporary transmitter site for some of New York City's television stations after the collapse of the World Trade Center, including its transmitting antenna, during the September 11, 2001 attacks.

See also
 Lattice tower
 List of towers
 List of famous transmission sites

References

External links
 
 Google Maps view of Armstrong Tower
 Special Event Station W2A - Armstrong Tower - includes museum photos
 Edwin H. Armstrong Plaque at the Armstrong Tower
 FCC History Cards for experimental radio station W2XMN (1936-1950)

Alpine, New Jersey
History of radio
Towers in New Jersey
Buildings and structures in Bergen County, New Jersey
Towers completed in 1938
1938 establishments in New Jersey
1938 in radio